"Kärleken är evig" ("Love is eternal") is a Swedish language song written by Torgny Söderberg and Per Gessle. Swedish pop singer Lena Philipsson sang "Kärleken är evig" at the Swedish Melodifestivalen 1986.

Overview 
It finished in second place, scoring 42 points. The song subsequently peaked at number three on the Swedish Singles Chart. The song was also at Svensktoppen for 7 weeks during the period 20 April-1 June 1986, with its highest position being second place during the debut week.

In 2001 the song was recorded by the Drifters on the band's studio album Om du vill ha mig.

Charts

References 

1986 singles
Lena Philipsson songs
Melodifestivalen songs of 1986
Songs written by Per Gessle
Songs written by Torgny Söderberg
Swedish-language songs
Drifters (Swedish band) songs
1986 songs
Mariann Grammofon singles